Awn Al-Saluli (born 2 September 1998) is a Saudi Arabian professional footballer who plays as a defender for Al-Taawoun.

Career
Al-Saluli started his career at the youth team of Al-Ittihad he arrived for the first team in 2017. He played his first match against Al-Raed and participated as a substitute for Ahmed Akaïchi . On 2 August 2019, Al-Saluli joined Al-Fayha on loan from Al-Ittihad. On 12 February 2021, Al-Saluli was loaned out to Al-Nahda. On 9 August 2021, Al-Saluli joined Al-Taawoun on a three-year contract.

References

External links 
 

1998 births
Living people
Saudi Arabian footballers
Saudi Arabia youth international footballers
Ittihad FC players
Al-Fayha FC players
Al-Nahda Club (Saudi Arabia) players
Al-Taawoun FC players
Saudi Professional League players
Saudi First Division League players
Association football defenders